Park Central is a suburb of Johannesburg, South Africa. It is located in Region F of the City of Johannesburg Metropolitan Municipality.

History
The suburb is situated on part of an old Witwatersrand farm called Turffontein. Established on the old slime dumps of the Ferreira Gold Mine, it became a suburb in May 1955. It was named after Central Park, New York, at one time was also waste ground. Prior to its reclamation in 2009, the main mine dump was the location of the old Top Star Drive-In.

References

Johannesburg Region F